In Colorado, State Highway 84 may refer to:
U.S. Route 84 in Colorado, the only Colorado highway numbered 84 since 1968
Colorado State Highway 84 (1923-1968) south of Steamboat Springs, now SH 134